Ashfield is a small village in the Registration county of Perth and the local government district of Stirling, Scotland.  It lies between the Allan Water and the Stirling-Perth Railway line. It is two miles north of Dunblane, and was designated a conservation village in 1976. It was originally built to house workers at a nearby silk-dyeing mill. Prior to this, a mill, Millash or Mill of Ash, existed, as did an extensive house or farm. Ashfield has four residential streets (Ochilview, Allanview, The Steading and The Cottages), a residential block (The Clachan) and also a square, named after the former prime minister William Gladstone, called Gladstone Square.

There are various annual activities based in the village hall such as a Blues festival, a Food festival and a Music festival.

References

External links

Ashfield
Ashfield
The Gazetteer for Scotland
RiverAllan WebCam : History
Stirling Council Conservation

Villages in Stirling (council area)